Gundoald or Gundwald (c. 565–616) was a Bavarian nobleman of the Agilolfing family, a son of Duke Garibald I and Waldrada, and Duke of Asti from sometime around 589.

In 588 his elder sister Theudelinda was engaged to the king of the Lombards, Authari. The potential marital alliance with the Lombards sparked an invasion by the Bavarains' overlords, the Franks, in 589. Theudelinda and Gundoald both fled to Italy. There Theudelinda married Authari in May, and Gundoald was invested with the duchy of Asti and the hand of a granddaughter of King Wacho in marriage. With her he had two children, Gundpert and Aripert.

Gundoald was killed by an arrow in 616.

References

Sources
 Paul the Deacon, Historia Langobardorum.
 Chronicle of Fredegar, The Fourth Book of the Chronicle of Fredegar with its Continuations.

External links
Gundoald at Mittelalter-Genealogie 

Dukes of Italy
Agilolfings
Baiuvarii
560s births
616 deaths
Year of birth uncertain
Deaths by arrow wounds